Serafim, the Lighthouse Keeper's Son (Serafin, svjetioničarev sin) is a 2002 Croatian film directed by Vicko Ruić. It is based on Bauk, a novel by Ulderiko Donadini.

References

External links
 

2002 films
2000s Croatian-language films
Croatian drama films
Films based on Croatian novels
2002 drama films